Anivision was a Korean animation studio. It was founded in March 1991, then merged with Sunwoo Entertainment in April 2003.

Filmography
 The Simpsons (1991–99; 59 episodes)
 Rugrats (1992–2002; 73 episodes)
 Aaahh!!! Real Monsters (1994–97; 50 episodes)
 Duckman (1994–97; 37 episodes)
 Edith Ann: Homeless Go Home (1994)
 Cro (1994)
 Santo Bugito (1995; 9 episodes)
 Quack Pack (1996)
 Space Goofs (1997; 15 episodes)
 Recess (1997-2003)
 Salty's Lighthouse (1997-98)
 Stressed Eric (1998; 6 episodes, uncredited)
 King of the Hill (1998, 2001; 3 episodes)
 The Wild Thornberrys (1998–2004; 79 episodes)
 Rocket Power (1999–2004; 32 episodes)
 As Told By Ginger (2000–06; 49 episodes)

References 

Mass media companies established in 1991
Mass media companies disestablished in 2000
South Korean animation studios
South Korean companies established in 1991
2000 disestablishments in South Korea